George Melachrino (born George Miltiades; 1 May 1909 – 18 June 1965) was a musician, composer of film music, and musical director who was English born of Greek and Italian descent. He was an accomplished player of the violin, viola, oboe, clarinet and saxophone.

George Melachrino was born in London, England.  As a young boy, he had a love of music. At the age of five, he began composing and by the age of fourteen he enrolled in the Trinity College of Music. In 1927, he began his career by singing and playing at the Savoy Hill Studios in London. For the next twelve years, he played in many different bands and orchestras. In the 1930s, Melachrino started working for bands led by Ambrose singing and playing saxophone with Carroll Gibbons at the Savoy Hotel London, and Bert Firman, and started playing on radio for the BBC. By 1939, he started his own band and secured a contract at the Café de Paris. He joined the Army a year later, and received training at the Corps of Military Police where he became a P.T. Instructor. Melachrino also gained experience as a military musician at the Army Broadcasting Department, as Musical Director for the recording of entertainment for overseas forces, leading the British Band of the Allied Expeditionary Forces and the Orchestra Khaki. 

After the war, in 1945, he formed the George Melachrino Orchestra, an orchestra that became synonymous with lush string arrangements. From 1945 to 1947, he conducted for Richard Tauber in most of his Parlophone recordings and BBC broadcasts. Beginning in the 1950s he specialized in easy listening arrangements of popular music standards. His ensemble recorded under the names, 'Melachinro Stinrgs' and the 'Melachrino Strings and Orchestra.'

In 1956, his orchestra's track "Autumn Concerto" reached number 18 in the UK Singles Chart, and remained in the chart for nine weeks.

Melachrino frequently performed on BBC and American Armed Forces Radio.

The "Starlight Roof Waltz", as performed by the George Melachrino Strings, was the signature tune of the radio programme Moeders wil is wet (1949–1974), the Dutch equivalent of Housewives' Choice.

His lead arranger during the British Band of the AEF and later with the Melachrino Strings was Bert Thompson, who also arranged "Little White Bull" and "The Young Ones".

Melachrino has a star on the Hollywood Walk of Fame.

Selected filmography
 Woman to Woman (1947)
 The Shop at Sly Corner (1947)
 No Orchids for Miss Blandish (1948)
 The Story of Shirley Yorke (1948)
 Dark Secret (1949)
 The Man from Yesterday (1949)
 Eight O'Clock Walk (1954)
 The Gamma People (1956)

Discography

References

External links
 George Melachrino site at spaceagepop.com
 

1909 births
1965 deaths
20th-century English composers
British people of Greek descent
English music arrangers
English people of Italian descent
Easy listening musicians
Light music composers
Musicians from London
Orchestra leaders
British Army personnel of World War II
Royal Military Police soldiers